Derrick Jerome Martin (born May 16, 1985) is a former American football safety. He was drafted by the Baltimore Ravens in the sixth round of the 2006 NFL Draft. He played college football at Wyoming.

He has also played for the Green Bay Packers, New York Giants, New England Patriots, and Chicago Bears. With the Packers, he won Super Bowl XLV over the Pittsburgh Steelers and the following year with the Giants, he won Super Bowl XLVI over the Patriots.

Early years
Martin attended Thomas Jefferson High School in Denver, CO where he led his team to the quarter final stage of the 2001 state playoffs and also the 2002 state semifinals. Martin also excelled at basketball where he was team captain. He was named Gatorade player of the year as a senior.

College career

Martin was recruited to play football for the Wyoming Cowboys by head coach Joe Glenn and his coaching staff.

As a Wyoming Cowboy he became an immediate contributor as a defensive back his freshman season, recovering a blocked punt and running it into the end zone for a touchdown in the season opener against Montana State.

Martin earned Second-team All-Conference honors as a sophomore, and helped lead the Wyoming Cowboys to a win over a heavily favored UCLA team by a score of 24-21 in the Las Vegas Bowl.

At the end of Martin’s junior season of 2005, he made the decision to enter the NFL Draft.

Martin played in a total of 30 games, making 24 starts and finishing his college career with 134 tackles and six interceptions.

Professional career

Baltimore Ravens
Martin was selected by the Baltimore Ravens in the sixth round (208th overall) in the 2006 NFL Draft. He was the first ever player to be selected by the Ravens out of the University of Wyoming. In his rookie season he played in eight games posting four tackles. He made his NFL debut versus the Carolina Panthers on October 15. In the 2007 season, he made 32 tackles.

Green Bay Packers
On September 5, 2009, Martin was traded to the Green Bay Packers for tackle Tony Moll. He was the Packers' Special Team ace in the 2009 season, and was one of the Packers two Special Teams captains (along with linebacker Desmond Bishop) in Green Bay's playoff loss at Arizona.

Martin was placed on injured reserve when he sustained a knee injury against the Washington Redskins on October 10, 2010.  Martin also recorded an interception, which he returned 15 yards that season.

On March 2, 2011, Martin was released by the Packers.

New York Giants
Derrick Martin signed with the New York Giants on August 15, 2011. He got his second Super Bowl championship in a row when the Giants defeated the New England Patriots in Super Bowl XLVI. Following the season, he became an unrestricted free agent.

New England Patriots
On August 4, 2012, Martin signed with the New England Patriots. Martin was released by the Patriots on August 31, 2012 during final cuts, and was re-signed by the Patriots on October 31, 2012.

Chicago Bears
On August 11, 2013, Martin signed with the Chicago Bears but was released on August 25. He was brought back by the Bears on November 13 after Charles Tillman was placed on injured reserve. Martin appeared in seven games in 2013 for the Bears, recording a tackle on defense and six on special teams. Martin was a free agent after 2013, but on February 24, 2014, he signed a one-year deal with Chicago. He was waived on May 28, 2014.

Home invasion
On January 20, 2013, Martin's home was invaded while he was out with his team at the AFC Championship game where the Baltimore Ravens defeated the Patriots 28-13; two masked men back forced their way into Martin's home in Aurora and held his wife Alexa Martin, and their three children at gunpoint. The police did not get a good enough description of the suspects to pursue a case. Police spokeswoman Cassidee Carlson said the suspects took some valuables, but wouldn't go into further detail about what was taken.

References

External links

New York Giants bio
Green Bay Packers bio
Wyoming Cowboys bio

1985 births
Living people
People from Westminster, Colorado
Players of American football from Colorado
American football cornerbacks
American football safeties
Wyoming Cowboys football players
Baltimore Ravens players
Green Bay Packers players
New York Giants players
New England Patriots players
Chicago Bears players